Hodierna of Jerusalem ( 1110 –  1164) was a Countess consort of Tripoli through her marriage to Raymond II of Tripoli, and regent of the County of Tripoli during the minority of her son from 1152 until 1155.

Early life
She was the daughter of Baldwin II of Jerusalem and the Armenian noblewoman Morphia. Hodierna was the third of four daughters; her older sisters were Melisende, who succeeded their father, and Alice, who aspired to rule Antioch, and her younger sister was Ioveta, abbess of Bethany.

Countess of Tripoli
Hodierna married Raymond II of Tripoli in about 1135. Hodierna was close to her sisters: she may have asked Melisende to arrange for the assassination of Alphonse I of Toulouse, son of Raymond IV of Toulouse, in 1148, when Alphonse came to claim the County of Tripoli. Hodierna supported Melisende in her struggle with her son Baldwin III in 1150-52. Melisende ended up on the losing side by 1152, but she was given a small fief to rule in Nablus, where she and Hodierna were able to influence the election of the Latin Patriarch.

Regency
In 1152, Hodierna was in the midst of a dispute with her husband Raymond II of Tripoli. Hodierna, like her sisters, was very independent, but Raymond was a jealous man and kept her in seclusion. There were even rumours that their daughter Melisende (named after the queen) was fathered by a different man. Her sister Melisende and her nephew Baldwin came north to intervene. Hodierna and Raymond agreed to reconcile, but it was also decided that Hodierna should return to Jerusalem with Melisende for a short time.

Almost as soon as they had left Tripoli, Raymond was killed by the Hashshashin. Hodierna immediately returned to assume the regency of the county for her son Raymond III, who was still a child. Baldwin ensured the support of the nobles of the county, and Hodierna allowed him to give the castle of Tortosa to the Knights Templar, in order to defend from an attack by Nur ad-Din Zangi, who invaded when he heard of Raymond's death. Hodierna remained regent until her son was declared adult in 1155.

Later life
Hodierna remained by Melisende's side when Melisende lay dying in 1161. Now rid of the influence of his mother, Baldwin III took personal control of Nablus, exchanging it with Philip of Milly who received the lordship of Oultrejordain in return. Hodierna gave her assent to this transaction on behalf of Melisende. Hodierna died at an unknown date, probably in the 1160s.

Legacy
According to the legendary Vida of the troubadour Jaufré Rudel of Blaye, the legend of her beauty, brought back to France by pilgrims, inspired Rudel's songs of amor de lonh — "distant love". The story claims that he took part in the Second Crusade in order to see her, but fell sick and was brought ashore dying. Hodierna is said to have come down from her castle on hearing the news, and Rudel died in her arms. This romantic but unlikely story seems to have been derived from the enigmatic nature of Rudel's verse and his presumed death on the Crusade. Edmond Rostand took it as the basis for his 1895 verse drama La Princesse Lointaine, but reassigned the female lead from Hodierna to her jilted daughter Melisende.

Sources
Hans E. Mayer, The Crusades. Oxford, 1965.
Steven Runciman, A History of the Crusades, vol. II: The Kingdom of Jerusalem. Cambridge University Press, 1952.
William of Tyre, A History of Deeds Done Beyond the Sea, trans. E.A. Babcock and A.C. Krey. Columbia University Press, 1943.

1110s births
1160s deaths
Year of birth uncertain
Year of death uncertain
12th-century women rulers
Countesses of Tripoli
Women of the Crusader states
Daughters of kings
Royalty of the Kingdom of Jerusalem